The Evening Descends is the second album by Norman, Oklahoma band Evangelicals.  The album employs a storybook structure, with many of the songs involving narratives that relate to one another.  The album was given an 8.3/10.0 by Pitchfork Media.

Track listing
 "The Evening Descends" - 3:09
 "Midnight Vignette" - 3:00
 "Skeleton Man" - 4:25
 "Stoned Again" - 4:32
 "Party Crashin'" - 5:12
 "Snowflakes" - 4:12
 "How Do You Sleep?" - 3:15
 "Bellawood" - 5:32
 "Paperback Suicide" - 3:54
 "Here in the Deadlights" - 3:52
 "Bloodstream" - 4:14

References

2008 albums